Quentin Halys was the defending champion but lost in the second round to Dan Evans.

Grégoire Barrère won the title after defeating Evans 4–6, 6–2, 6–3 in the final.

Seeds
All seeds receive a bye into the second round.

Draw

Finals

Top half

Section 1

Section 2

Bottom half

Section 3

Section 4

References
Main draw
Qualifying draw

2019 ATP Challenger Tour
2019 Singles